Forlandet National Park lies on the Norwegian archipelago of Svalbard. The park was created by a royal resolution on 1 June 1973 and covers the entire island of Prins Karls Forland and well as the sea around it. The Norwegian national park has an area of 616 km2 and a marine area of 4031 km2.

This area is recognized for the world's most northerly range of stone seals and also the world's most northerly population of common guillemot. In the region there are numerous archeological remains from Norwegian and Russian hunters and whalers.

Forlandsøyane Bird Sanctuary inside the park has been recognised as a wetland of international importance by designation under the Ramsar Convention. The national park has also been identified as an Important Bird Area (IBA) by BirdLife International because it supports breeding populations of barnacle geese, common eiders and black guillemots.

References

Further reading
  Norwegian Directorate for Nature Management on Forlandet National Park

National parks of Svalbard
Protected areas established in 1973
1973 establishments in Norway
Ramsar sites in Norway
Important Bird Areas of Svalbard
Seabird colonies
Prins Karls Forland